Myliobatis is a genus of eagle rays in the family Myliobatidae.

Description
Their bodies consist of a rhomboidal disc, wider than long, with one dorsal fin. The head is broad and short, with eyes and spiracles on the sides. The tail is slender, with one or two large spines at the base, without tail fin.

The teeth are arranged in the lower and upper jaws in flat tooth plates called pavement teeth, each consisting of about seven series of plates, which are used to crush clam shells and crustaceans.

Biology
Myliobatis species are ovoviviparous. Their gestation last about 6 months and a female produces four to seven embryos. Myliobatis species mainly feed on molluscs, bottom-living crustaceans, and small fishes.

Habitat
Mylobatis species live in warm, shallow waters. Adults prefer sandy shores, while juveniles can usually be encountered offshore.

Species

Extant species
Currently, 11 species in this genus are recognized:

Extinct species

Extinct species within this genus include:

†Myliobatis acutus Agassiz, 1843
†Myliobatis affinis Chapman & Cudmore, 1924
†Myliobatis albestii Pauca, 1929 
†Myliobatis altavillae Meschinelli, 1924 
†Myliobatis altus Davis, 1888 
†Myliobatis americanus Bravard, 1884
†Myliobatis angustidens Sismonda, 1849
†Myliobatis angustus Agassiz, 1843
†Myliobatis arcuatus Davis, 1888 
†Myliobatis bellardii Issel, 1877
†Myliobatis bilobatus Dartevelle & Casier, 1943 
†Myliobatis bisulcus Marsh, 1870
†Myliobatis bothriodon White, 1926 
†Myliobatis canaliculatus Agassiz, 1843
†Myliobatis colei Agassiz, 1843
†Myliobatis crassidens Dartevelle & Casier, 1959 
†Myliobatis dimorphus Delfortrie, 1871
†Myliobatis dispar Leriche, 1913 
†Myliobatis dixoni Agassiz, 1843
†Myliobatis elatus Stromer, 1905 
†Myliobatis enormis Mendiola, 1999 
†Myliobatis erctensis Salinas, 1901 
†Myliobatis fastigiatus Leidy, 1876
†Myliobatis fraasi Stromer, 1905
†Myliobatis frangens Eastman, 1904 
†Myliobatis funiculatus Delfortrie, 1871
†Myliobatis gigas Cope, 1867 
†Myliobatis girondicus Pedroni, 1844
†Myliobatis goniopleurus Agassiz, 1843
†Myliobatis granulosus Issel, 1877
†Myliobatis haueri Penecke, 1884
†Myliobatis holmesii Gibbes, 1849
†Myliobatis intermedius Dartevelle & Casier, 1943 
†Myliobatis kummeli Fowler, 1911 
†Myliobatis lagaillardei Thomas, 1904 
†Myliobatis lateralis Agassiz, 1843
†Myliobatis leidyi Hay, 1899
†Myliobatis leognanensis Delfortrie, 1871
†Myliobatis lepersonnei Dartevelle & Casier, 1959 
†Myliobatis llopisi Bauzá & Gomez Pallerola, 1982 
†Myliobatis magister Leidy, 1876
†Myliobatis marginalis Agassiz, 1843
†Myliobatis merriami Jordan & Beal, 1913 
†Myliobatis meyeri Weiler, 1922 
†Myliobatis micropleurus Agassiz, 1843
†Myliobatis microrhizus Delfortrie, 1871
†Myliobatis miocenicus Böhm, 1942 
†Myliobatis mokattamensis Stromer, 1905 
†Myliobatis monnieri Cappetta, 1986 
†Myliobatis moorabbinensis Chapman & Pritchard, 1907 
†Myliobatis mordax Leidy, 1876
†Myliobatis moutai Dartevelle & Casier, 1959 
†Myliobatis nzadinensis Dartevelle & Casier, 1943
†Myliobatis oweni Agassiz, 1843
†Myliobatis pachyodon Cope, 1867 
†Myliobatis pachyrhizodus Fowler, 1911 
†Myliobatis pentoni Woodward, 1893 
†Myliobatis placentinus Carraroli, 1897
†Myliobatis plicatilis Davis, 1888 
†Myliobatis prenticei Chapman & Cudmore, 1924 
†Myliobatis raouxi Arambourg, 1952 
†Myliobatis rima Meyer, 1844
†Myliobatis rivierei Sauvage, 1878
†Myliobatis rugosus Leidy, 1855 
†Myliobatis salentinus Botti, 1877
†Myliobatis semperei Mendiola, 1999 
†Myliobatis sendaicus Hatai, Murata & Masuda, 1965 
†Myliobatis serratus Meyer, 1843 
†Myliobatis sinhaleyus Deraniyagala, 1937 
†Myliobatis stokesii Agassiz, 1843
†Myliobatis striatus Buckland, 1837
†Myliobatis strobeli Issel, 1877
†Myliobatis testae Philippi, 1846 
†Myliobatis tewarii Mishra, 1980 
†Myliobatis toliapicus Agassiz, 1843
†Myliobatis transversalis Gibbes, 1849
†Myliobatis tumidens Woodward, 1889 
†Myliobatis undulatus Chaffee, 1939 
†Myliobatis vicomicanus Cope, 1867 
†Myliobatis wurnoensis White, 1934 

These eagle rays lived from the Cretaceous to the Quaternary periods (from 70.6 to 0.012 Ma). Fossils of these fishes have been found worldwide.

The extinct species Myliobatis dixoni is known from Tertiary deposits along the Atlantic seaboards of the United States, Brazil, Nigeria, England, and Germany.

Gallery

See also
 List of prehistoric cartilaginous fish

References

Further reading
 
 Compagno, L.J.V. (1999): Checklist of living elasmobranchs. A: Hamlett W.C. (ed.) Sharks, skates, and rays: the biology of elasmobranch fishes., The Johns Hopkins University Press: 471-498. 
 
 
 Walker, C. & Ward, D. (1993): - Fossielen: Sesam Natuur Handboeken, Bosch & Keuning, Baarn. 

 
Ray genera
Taxa named by Georges Cuvier